The WWP All-Africa Heavyweight Championship is a professional wrestling championship in the South African Professional wrestling promotion World Wrestling Professionals, contested exclusively among Heavyweight (>=) wrestlers born in Africa. It was created on 21 March 2008 when Kilimanjaro defeated Ananzi on an episode of WWP Thunderstrike.

Title history

See also

World Wrestling Professionals

References

External links

World Wrestling Professionals championships
Heavyweight wrestling championships
Continental professional wrestling championships